Hawkins Bank is a large submerged bank off the Mascarene Plateau. It is considered a dependency of Mauritius (in terms of fishing banks, much like the Saya de Malha Bank, Nazareth Bank, and the Soudan Banks). The bank is abundant with fish and Mauritian vessels often fish in the waters in and around the bank.

See also 
 Nazareth Bank
 Saya de Malha Bank
 Soudan Banks

Marine ecoregions
Landforms of Mauritius
Fishing areas of the Indian Ocean
Outer Islands of Mauritius
Landforms of Africa
Undersea banks of the Indian Ocean